Jesper Knudsen (born 11 July 2004) is a speedway rider from Denmark.

Speedway career 
Knudsen is a product of the Skaerbaek Motor Club and was the 250cc world champion in 2020. He signed for Unia Leszno in the Polish Ekstraliga.

In 2022, he achieved his greatest feat to date after winning the European Individual Junior Championship in Hungary. Also in 2022, he helped SES win the 2022 Danish Super League.

Family
His older brother Jonas Knudsen is also a professional speedway rider.

References 

Living people
2004 births
Danish speedway riders